Grigoreşti may refer to:

Grigoreşti, a village in Siminicea Commune, Suceava County, Romania
Grigoreşti, a village in Alexăndreni Commune, Sîngerei district, Moldova

See also
Grigorescu